Idaea sympractor is a moth of the family Geometridae. It is found in northern Madagascar.

this species has a wingspan of 13-15mm, it is similar to Idaea lycaugidia but in average smaller and browner, with stronger grey irrorations or suffusions.

References

Sterrhini
Moths described in 1932
Moths of Madagascar